The Srednyaya Zheleznaya is a river in Sverdlovsk Oblast, Russia. The river mouth is located in 58 km on the right side of the river Is, a tributary of the Tura. The length of the river is 10 km. It belongs to the Irtysh Basin.

See also 
List of rivers of Russia

References 

Rivers of Sverdlovsk Oblast